"Poor Poll" is a poem written by Robert Bridges in 1921, and first collected in his book New Verse (1925).  The poem is the first example of Bridges' Neo-Miltonic Syllabics.

"Poor Poll" was composed at the same time as T. S. Eliot was writing The Waste Land. Both Eliot and Bridges were searching for a medium which would allow the incorporation of a wide variety of material, including phrases in foreign languages. Bridges wrote in a later essay,  "It was partly this wish for liberty to use various tongues that made me address my first experiment to a parrot, but partly also my wish to discover how a low setting of scene and diction would stand; because one of the main limitations of English verse is that its accentual (dot and go one) bumping is apt to make ordinary words ridiculous"

It has been suggested that Bridges' poem was a conscious parody of Eliot's. Like The Waste Land, Poor Poll includes many classical allusions and phrases in foreign languages (including French, German, Latin, and Ancient Greek). Also like Eliot's work, Bridges' was published with a set of footnotes supplied by the poet. Bridges' footnotes are headed "Metrical Elucidations", and offer advice on the poem's scansion as well as explaining some of the allusions.

Here are a few lines from Bridges' poem:

Why ask? You cannot know. 'Twas by no choice of yours
that you mischanged for monkeys' man's society,
'twas that British sailor drove you from Paradise —
Εἴθ᾿ ὤφελ᾿ Ἀργους μὴ διαπτάσθαι σκάφος!
I'd hold embargoes on such a ghastly traffic.
I am writing verses to you & grieve that you shd be
absolument incapable de les comprendre,
Tu, Polle, nescis ista nec potes scire: —

References

1921 poems
British poems